"(How to Be A) Millionaire" is a song by English new wave and synth-pop band ABC. It was the first single taken from their third studio album, How to Be a ... Zillionaire!

The single peaked at a modest No. 49 on the UK Singles Chart, though it fared better in the US where it reached No. 20 on the US Billboard Hot 100 and No. 4 on the Hot Dance Club Play chart.

Composition
The song is in a D key and a major mode with a BPM of 122.

Music video
The animated music video shows a cartoon Martin Fry and Mark White being overwhelmed by their luxury goods, which are continually growing in size. The other two band members make a brief appearance also in animated form.

Track listing

7": Neutron NT107
"(How to Be A) Millionaire" – 3:30
"(How to Be A) Billionaire" – 3:37

12": Neutron NTXR 107
"(How to Be A) Zillionaire" (Bond Street Mix) – 6:05
"(How to Be A) Millionaire" (Single Remix) – 3:31
"(How to Be A) Millionaire" (A Capella Version) – 3:30

12": Neutron NTX 107
"(How to Be A) Zillionaire" (Wall Street Mix) – 7:33
"(How to Be A) Millionaire" – 3:31
"(How to Be A) Millionaire" (Accapella) – 3:30
"(How to Be A) Millionaire" (Nickel & Dime Mix) – 5:22 (included on US version only)

Chart performance

Popular culture
The CBS Orchestra played the song for Regis Philbin when he was a guest on the Late Show with David Letterman. Philbin was the former host of Who Wants to Be a Millionaire for the ABC television network.
 The song appears on the in-game radio station Wave 103 in the video game Grand Theft Auto: Vice City Stories, released in 2006.

References

1984 singles
ABC (band) songs
Songs written by Martin Fry
Songs written by Mark White (musician)
1984 songs
Mercury Records singles
Animated music videos